Sauk Centre is a city in Stearns County, Minnesota, United States. The population was 4,555 at the 2020 census. Sauk Centre is part of the St. Cloud Metropolitan Statistical Area.

Sauk Centre is the birthplace of Sinclair Lewis, a novelist and winner of the Nobel Prize in Literature. It inspired his fictional Gopher Prairie, the setting of Lewis's 1920 novel Main Street. There are two sculptures of Lewis in Sauk Centre; one life size sculpture just outside the public library named after him and a bust, sculpted by Joseph Kiselewski, inside the library.

History
The town was originally named by a lottery. The eight original town shareholders submitted suggestions for a name, and Sauk Centre was selected. The name was submitted by Alexander Moore, who originally bought and platted the town. Sauk refers to the many place names associated with the Sauk tribe (Sauk River, Sauk Rapids, Little Sauk, Osakis, etc). Centre (the British spelling of "center") refers to the town's central location between Sauk Rapids and Lake Osakis. When the Sauk Centre post office was established it used the spelling "Sauk Center", until 1936 when the city won its fight to spell the name as Moore suggested.

Sauk Centre contains the Sinclair Lewis Boyhood Home, a National Historic Landmark. Two other properties and a historic district are listed on the National Register of Historic Places: The Palmer House built in 1901 and expanded in 1916, the Minnesota Home School for Girls built 1911–1935, and the Original Main Street Historic District built 1920–1947.

Geography

Sauk Centre is located along Interstate 94/U.S. Highway 52, U.S. Highway 71, and Minnesota State Highway 28.

The city is considered to be in the middle of the state.  Sauk Lake and Sauk River are the most notable water features of the area.  Fairy Lake and Lily Lake are located just outside of the city limits.

Demographics

2010 census
As of the census of 2010, there were 4,317 people, 1,851 households, and 1,174 families living in the city. The racial makeup of the city was 95.6% White, 0.8% African American, 0.1% Native American, 0.3% Asian, 2.2% from other races, and 0.9% from two or more races. Hispanic or Latino of any race were 4.4% of the population.

There were 1,851 households, of which 28.4% had children under the age of 18 living with them, 50.5% were married couples living together, 9.4% had a female householder with no husband present, 3.6% had a male householder with no wife present, and 36.6% were non-families. 32.1% of all households were made up of individuals, and 18% had someone living alone who was 65 years of age or older. The average household size was 2.28 and the average family size was 2.86.

The median age in the city was 41.4 years. 22.9% of residents were under the age of 18; 8.2% were between the ages of 18 and 24; 22.8% were from 25 to 44; 24.3% were from 45 to 64; and 21.6% were 65 years of age or older. The gender makeup of the city was 47.4% male and 52.6% female.

2000 census
As of the census of 2000, there were 3,930 people, 1,616 households, and 1,042 families living in the city. The racial makeup of the city was 98.68% White, 0.31% African American, 0.13% Native American, 0.25% Asian, 0.25% from other races, and 0.38% from two or more races. Hispanic or Latino of any kind were 0.53% of the population.

There were 1,616 households, out of which 30.4% had children under the age of 18 living with them, 53.0% were married couples living together, 8.5% had a female householder with no husband present, and 35.5% were non-families. 31.4% of all households were made up of individuals, and 17.8% had someone living alone who was 65 years of age or older. The average household size was 2.38 and the average family size was 3.01.

In the city, the population was spread out, with 25.6% under the age of 18, 8.2% from 18 to 24, 25.1% from 25 to 44, 18.6% from 45 to 64, and 22.5% who were 65 years of age or older.  The median age was 39 years. For every 100 females, there were 89.4 males.  For every 100 females age 18 and over, there were 85.4 males.

The median income for a household in the city was $37,644, and the median income for a family was $47,623. Males had a median income of $33,382 versus $20,399 for females. The per capita income for the city was $18,390.  About 2.3% of families and 5.2% of the population were below the poverty line, including 2.9% of those under age 18 and 8.0% of those age 65 or over.

Churches
 Harvest Community Church
 Our Lady of the Angels Catholic Church
 Saint Paul's Catholic Church (home of the first U.S. shrine dedicated to the Divine Mercy of Jesus, dedicated 1982)
 First Lutheran Church (ELCA)
 Zion Lutheran Church (LCMS)
 Faith Baptist Church
 United Church of Christ Methodist Church
 River of Life Assembly of God Church
 Good Samaritan Episcopal Church
 Kingdom Hall of Jehovah's Witnesses
 Sauk Centre United Methodist Church
 Tierra Prometida A/D

Notable people

 Joshua Harrison Bruce - farmer and Minnesota legislator
 Benjamin F. DuBois — banker and Minnesota legislator
 Ody J. Fish — Chairman of the Republican Party of Wisconsin
 Rachael Ellering — professional wrestler
 Harold Palmer Howard, U.S. Army brigadier general
 Sinclair Lewis — American novelist and playwright, 1930 Nobel Prize winner in Literature
 Joseph T. Niehaus, Sr. - farmer, businessman, beekeeper, and Minnesota legislator
 Sylvester Uphus — farmer and Minnesota legislator
 Harry C. Van Norman - businessman and Illinois legislator
 Cory Undlin - NFL Coach

Education
There are two schools in the town: Holy Family and Sauk Centre Public School.
Holy Family is a Catholic private school; it enrolls students from kindergarten to 6th grade.
Sauk Centre Public School has two departments: elementary (kindergarten to 6th grade) and secondary school (7th to 12th grade). The mascot of Sauk Centre Public Schools is the Mainstreeters, in honor of Lewis' novel.

Other
A violent local incident in 1996, where the elderly Paul Crawford shot and killed four members of the neighboring Schloegl family over a property dispute, was featured in the episode "Lake of Madness" on the Investigation Discovery series Fear Thy Neighbor. The episode aired on April 20, 2015.

References

External links

 City of Sauk Centre official website
 Tri-CAP (Transit/bus)
 Sauk Centre public records at Open-Public-Records.com

Cities in Stearns County, Minnesota
Cities in Minnesota
St. Cloud, Minnesota metropolitan area